is a pair of 2002 sports video games released by Konami, one for the GameCube, and the other for the Game Boy Advance.

Teams 
 The Superstars (Mickey Mouse)
 The Charmers (Minnie Mouse)
 The Seaducks (Donald Duck)
 The Belles (Daisy Duck)
 The Spacenuts (Goofy)
 The TinyRockets (Huey, Dewey, and Louie & José Carioca)
 The Shifters (Max Goof)
 The Steamrollers (Pete)
 The Imperials (Mortimer Mouse)
 Mickey's All-Stars (Mickey, Minnie and Huey)
 Donald's All-Stars (Donald, Daisy and Dewey)
 Goofy's All-Stars (Goofy, Max and Louie)
 Pete's All-Stars (Pete, Mortimer and Big Bad Wolf)

Reception 

The Game Boy Advance version received above-average reviews, while the GameCube version received "unfavorable" reviews, according to the review aggregation website Metacritic. In Japan, Famitsu gave it a score of 26 out of 40 for the GameCube version, and 25 out of 40 for the GBA version.

References

External links 
 

2002 video games
Basketball video games
Basketball
Game Boy Advance games
GameCube games
Konami games
Multiplayer and single-player video games
Donald Duck video games
Mickey Mouse video games
Goofy (Disney) video games
Video games developed in Japan